Presidency of State Security is a Saudi Arabian security body created in 2017 by combining the counterterrorism and domestic intelligence services under one roof. The new body will be concerned with all matters related to state security, and will be overseen by the king.
The new state security agency is headed by intelligence chief Abdul Aziz bin Mohammed Al-Howairini, who holds the rank of a minister.

The following departments were annexed to the new Presidency of State Security: General Investigations, Special Security Force, Special Emergency Force, security aviation, technical affairs, National Information Center, and other departments in charge of combating terrorism, and finance and financial investigation.

See also

 General Intelligence Presidency – Saudi Arabian external security agency
 Mabahith

References

Saudi Arabian intelligence agencies
Secret police
2017 establishments in Saudi Arabia
Government agencies established in 2017